Indecent Exposure was a 1970s compilation album from comedian George Carlin.  It was his final release on the Little David label.  The album was released on vinyl and cassette, but never CD.

Track listing

1978 greatest hits albums
George Carlin albums
1970s comedy albums
Little David Records compilation albums